Jotunheimen Fjellstue is a tourist hut in the Norwegian province Oppland.

The hut is located about 1000 meters above sea level in the high mountains Jotunheimen. It is located on Norwegian County Road 55, the Sognefjellsvegen, between Galdesanden and the Leirdal.

External links
 Jotunheimen Fjellstue
 Norwegian Trekking Association Jotunheimen Fjellstue

Tourist huts in Norway
Jotunheimen